Ås is the Scandinavian language word for an esker, a ridge of sand and gravel. 

Ås may also refer to:

People
Ås (surname)
Berit Ås (born 1928), a Norwegian politician and Professor Emerita of social psychology at the University of Oslo
Olof Ås (1892—1949), a Swedish theater and film actor stage manager
Peder Ås, a fictional character and placeholder name used in Norwegian legal writings

Places

Finland
Ås, the Swedish name for the Harju quarter in Helsinki

Norway
Ås, Viken, a municipality in Viken county
Ås, Aust-Agder, a village in Birkenes municipality in Aust-Agder county
Ås Station, a railway station on the Østfold Line in Ås, Viken county
Ås, Trøndelag, a village in Tydal municipality in Trøndelag county

Sweden
Ås, Nora, a locality situated in Nora Municipality, Örebro County
Ås Abbey, a former Cistercian monastery situated near the mouth of the River Viskan in Halland
Ås, Krokom Municipality, a locality in Krokom Municipality, Jämtland County

Other
Ås IF, a Swedish football club located in Ås near Östersund
Ås Avis, a weekly newspaper in the municipality of Ås, Norway
Ås, the singular noun for the fabled Norwegian Æsir

See also
Aas (disambiguation)